Sir Robert George Cooper, CBE (24 June 1936 – 15 November 2004), popularly known as Sir Bob Cooper, was a politician and equal opportunities activist in Northern Ireland.

Born and raised in the east of County Donegal in the north-west of Ulster, Cooper, a Presbyterian, attended Foyle College and then studied law at The Queen's University of Belfast, where he was the Chair of the Young Unionists. Despite his Protestant Unionist background, Cooper married a Catholic.

In 1970, Cooper became a founder member of the Alliance Party of Northern Ireland, and at the 1973 Northern Ireland Assembly election, he was elected for West Belfast. He served as Minister for Manpower Services, a junior position in the Sunningdale Northern Ireland Executive.   Soon after, he became deputy leader of the party, and in 1975 he was elected to the Northern Ireland Constitutional Convention.

In 1976, Cooper left politics to take up an appointment as head of the Fair Employment Agency.  In 1990, this became the Fair Employment Commission, and he continued in the post until 1999.  He then headed the Integrated Education Fund until shortly before his death.

Cooper was appointed Commander of the Order of the British Empire (CBE) in the 1987 Birthday Honours and was knighted in the 1998 Birthday Honours for services to equal opportunities. His wife was Lady Pat Cooper.

References

External links
"Obituary: Sir Robert (Bob) Cooper", Belfast Telegraph
Ford pays tribute to Bob Cooper, founding Alliance member

1936 births
2004 deaths
Alliance Party of Northern Ireland politicians
Members of the Northern Ireland Assembly 1973–1974
Members of the Northern Ireland Constitutional Convention
Commanders of the Order of the British Empire
Knights Bachelor
Politicians awarded knighthoods
Politicians from County Donegal
Alumni of Queen's University Belfast
People educated at Foyle College
Junior ministers of the 1974 Northern Ireland Assembly